Jeff Rock (born ) is a Canadian clergyman, who succeeded Brent Hawkes as the pastor of the Metropolitan Community Church of Toronto in fall 2017.

Born and raised in Sudbury, Ontario, he came out as gay in high school. He studied microbiology and immunology at McGill University, initially with the career goal of becoming an HIV/AIDS researcher, although he decided during his studies that he instead wanted to become a minister. After completing his seminary studies, he became the pastor of Gaetz Memorial United Church in Red Deer, Alberta, where he worked with organizations such as the Central Alberta AIDS Network, the local Truth and Reconcilaition Commission, the Urban Aboriginal Voices Society and the Red Deer Interfaith Network. He ran as a Liberal Party of Canada candidate for the electoral district of Red Deer—Lacombe in the 2015 election, against incumbent MP Blaine Calkins.

He gave his first sermon to Toronto's MCC congregation on July 9, 2017, at a service dedicated to the memory of former Toronto City Councillor Pam McConnell. He officially succeeded Hawkes on October 1.

Electoral record

References

1980s births
Activists from Ontario
Canadian clergy
Gay politicians
Canadian LGBT politicians
LGBT Protestant clergy
Canadian LGBT rights activists
Living people
Metropolitan Community Church clergy
Candidates in the 2015 Canadian federal election
Alberta candidates for Member of Parliament
Politicians from Greater Sudbury
Politicians from Toronto
Clergy from Toronto
McGill University Faculty of Science alumni
Liberal Party of Canada candidates for the Canadian House of Commons
Ministers of the United Church of Canada
21st-century Canadian LGBT people
Canadian gay men